Murder in Millennium VI is a  science fiction novel by author Curme Gray.  It was published in 1951 by Shasta Publishers in an edition of 2,500 copies, and included in a Mystery Guild omnibus edition.  The novel was the subject of an extensive analysis in Damon Knight's In Search of Wonder (1956).  Paul Di Filippo favorably describes it as "utter futuristic strangeness unleavened by infodumps." Less sympathetically, Groff Conklin, reviewing the novel on its release, declared that "The style is opaque, the characters wooden. posturing empty, and unreal." P. Schuyler Miller reported that although the novel violated most of the standard conventions of the mystery story, and is "unfair to organized readers" who expect that all the information needed to resolve the mystery is presented in the story, the novel still creates "a growing fascination in the situation as it unravels -- or rather entangles itself -- which is rather effective."

Plot introduction
Set 6,000 years in the future, the novel concerns the murder of the head of a matriarchal society.  Victor Mitchel and his parents and sister struggle to replace her and find the killer before the society collapses.  The novel is unique in that anything which would have been known to the people of its time was not explained.

Notes

References

1951 American novels
1951 science fiction novels
American science fiction novels
American mystery novels